Te Rāpaki-o-Te Rakiwhakaputa, commonly known as Rāpaki or Rapaki, is a small settlement within the Lyttelton Harbour basin.

Rāpaki is one of four Banks Peninsula rūnanga (communities) based around marae (tribal meeting grounds). The Rāpaki Marae, also known as Te Wheke Marae, is a meeting ground of Ngāi Tahu and its Te Hapū o Ngāti Wheke branch. It includes a wharenui (meeting house), called Te Wheke to be opened in 2008, was carved by Riki Manuel and Fayne Robinson and the tukutuku panels were overseen by local weaver 'Aunty' Doe Parata. The carvings of the wharenui trace the almost 400 years of continuous settlement related to the arrival of the ancestor Te Rakiwhakaputa.

Rāpaki is overlooked by the peak Te Poho o Tamatea. According to one legend, the Ngāi Tahu chief Te Rakiwhakaputa named the place by laying his waist mat (rāpaki) down to claim it. The full name of Rāpaki is Te Rāpaki-o-Te Rakiwhakaputa, meaning the waist mat of Te Rakiwhakaputa. On 8 July 2020, the New Zealand Geographic Board assigned the full name as the official name of the locality.

References 

Populated places in Canterbury, New Zealand